Adult Swim Presents: ...And You Will Know Us by the Trail of Dead on Tour with Dethklok (also known as simply Trail of Dead/Dethklok) is a split EP released by Dethklok and ...And You Will Know Us by the Trail of Dead. It was released for free at concerts to coincide with their shared 2007–2008 tour. The EP features a CD that includes songs from both bands, and a DVD that features Metalocalypse promo videos.

Release
The EP was given out for free at the band's 2007 university tour. The track listing for the Dethklok songs is incorrect, it states that the three songs are Hatredcopter, Fan Song, and Deththeme. The CD also states that the ...And You Will Know Us by the Trail of Dead song "Blood Rites" was released on their album Madonna, but it was actually released on Source Tags & Codes.

The college dates for the tour were as follows:
Oct. 29 - University of New Mexico, Albuquerque, NM
Oct. 31 - University of Nevada, Las Vegas, NV
Nov. 01 - University of California, Los Angeles, CA
Nov. 02 - University of California, Berkeley, CA
Nov. 05 - Colorado State University, Fort Collins, CO
Nov. 07 - University of Minnesota, Minneapolis, MN
Nov. 08 - University of South Dakota, Vermillion, SD
Nov. 11 - University of Colorado, Boulder, CO
Nov. 13 - Southern Illinois University, Carbondale, IL
Nov. 15 - (CANCELLED) University of Oklahoma, Norman, OK
Nov. 17 - University of Kansas, Lawrence, KS
Nov. 18 - Northwestern University, Chicago, IL

Track listing

CD

DVD

Personnel

Dethklok
Brendon Small – guitar, bass guitar, vocals
Gene Hoglan – drums

...And You Will Know Us by the Trail of Dead
Conrad Keely – vocals
Kevin Allen – guitar
Jason Reece – drums
Doni Schroader – percussion
Daniel Wood – bass

References

...And You Will Know Us by the Trail of Dead albums
2007 EPs
Dethklok albums
Metalocalypse
Albums produced by Ulrich Wild
Williams Street Records albums
Split EPs
Promotional albums